The women's 200 metres event  at the 1992 European Athletics Indoor Championships were held at the Palasport di Genova in Genoa, Italy from 29 February-1 March 1992.

Medalists

Results

Heats
First 3 from each heat (Q) and the next 3 fastest (q) qualified for the semifinals.

Semifinals
First 3 from each semifinal qualified directly (Q) for the final.

Final

References

200 metres at the European Athletics Indoor Championships
200
1992 in women's athletics